Klaus Fatmir Gjasula (born 14 December 1989) is an Albanian professional footballer who plays as a defensive midfielder for Darmstadt 98.

Club career
Ahead of the 2020–21 season Gjasula moved to Hamburger SV from SC Paderborn, signing a two-year contract. In the first two league games, head coach Daniel Thioune played him in a 4-2-3-1 formation alongside Amadou Onana in defensive midfield. In the 4–3 win in the second league game of the season against his former club Paderborn, Gjasula conceded two goals within a few minutes due to individual mistakes. In the following seven matches he would only appear as a substitute. In December, Gjasula returned to the starting line-up, but then suffered a torn inner ligament in his left knee during practice around the turn of the year. Gjasula made his comeback on 12 March 2021, when he came on as a substitute in the 90th minute in 0–2 away win over VfL Bochum.

International career
Gjasula made his Albania national football team debut on 7 September 2019 in a Euro 2020 qualifier against France, when he substituted Ylber Ramadani in the 53rd minute and was cautioned in the remaining time.

Personal life
Gjasula was born in the capital of Albania, Tirana and raised in Freiburg, Germany. He holds both Albanian and German citizenship. His older brother Jürgen Gjasula is a footballer who plays as a attacking midfielder.

Career statistics

References

External links
 Klaus Gjasula at Kicker
 

1989 births
Living people
Footballers from Tirana
Albanian footballers
Sportspeople from Freiburg im Breisgau
Albanian emigrants to Germany
German people of Albanian descent
Albanian expatriates in Germany
Association football midfielders
German footballers
Albania international footballers
Freiburger FC players
Bahlinger SC players
SV Waldhof Mannheim players
MSV Duisburg II players
Offenburger FV players
Kickers Offenbach players
Stuttgarter Kickers players
Hallescher FC players
SC Paderborn 07 players
Hamburger SV players
SV Darmstadt 98 players
3. Liga players
2. Bundesliga players
Bundesliga players
Footballers from Baden-Württemberg